Clairemarie Osta (born 1970) is a French ballet dancer who performed with the Paris Opera Ballet as an étoile. In 2017, she became the head of the ballet department at the Royal Swedish Ballet School.

Early life
Osta was born in Nice, and started ballet at age 5. She trained at the Conservatoire de Nice, and then the Conservatoire de Paris. In 1987, she enrolled in Paris Opera Ballet School, at the encouragement of Roland Petit, and trained there for a year.

Career
Osta joined the Paris Opera Ballet in 1988. In 1994, she won third prize at the Varna International Ballet Competition. In 2002, at age 32, Osta was named étoile after a performance of Paquita. Choreographers she had worked with include Rudolf Nureyev, Carolyn Carlson, John Neumeier, Jiří Kylián, Jerome Robbins, Roland Petit, Mats Ek and William Forsythe. Osta retired from the Paris Opera Ballet in 2012, following a performance of Manon.

Osta became the director of choreographic studies at Conservatoire de Paris in 2013, then ran the L’Atelier d’Art Chorégraphique between 2015 and 2017. In 2017, she became the head of ballet at Royal Swedish Ballet School in Stockholm.

Osta is a recipient of the Chevalier des Arts et des Lettres and Chevalier de la Légion d'honneur.

Personal life
Osta is married to Nicolas Le Riche, previously an étoile at the Paris Opera Ballet and now head of the Royal Swedish Ballet. They have two daughters.

References

Paris Opera Ballet étoiles
Living people
1970 births
20th-century ballet dancers
20th-century French dancers
21st-century ballet dancers
21st-century French dancers
French ballerinas
Prima ballerinas
People from Nice
Conservatoire de Paris alumni
French expatriates in Sweden
Chevaliers of the Légion d'honneur
Chevaliers of the Ordre des Arts et des Lettres
20th-century French women